No Man's Time is the title of a 'key' group exhibition of fine art of the early-1990s which has become a 'well-known historical show'. The exhibition was selected by French art critic and curator Eric Troncy with Nicolas Bourriaud and Villa Arson Director Christian Bernard. The exhibits were on display through 6 July to 30 September, 1991 at Villa Arson in Nice, France.

Artists included in the exhibition

Angela Bulloch
Sylvie Fleury
Liam Gillick
Henry Bond
Felix Gonzalez-Torres
Karen Kilimnik
Aimee Morgana
Johan Muyle
Richard Agerbeek
Rob Pruitt and Jack Early
Martin Kippenberger
Philippe Parreno
Allen Ruppersberg
Lily van der Stokker
 Jim Shaw
Pierre Joseph
Dominique Gonzalez-Foerster
Xavier Veilhan

References

Art exhibitions in France
Contemporary art exhibitions